The Sydney Road Community School is a small government school located in Sydney Road in the Melbourne suburb of Brunswick. It has approximately 100 students from Year 7 to Year 12. Established in 1972 at the height of the alternative education movement, the school has no fees, no uniform and no examinations until Year 12. The school prides itself on being able to achieve success with students who may have struggled in the mainstream school system. This does, however, mean that the school often ranks lowly in academic rankings of schools.

The school is located in a small former Wesleyan church in the busy commercial district. The building is one of the oldest in the Brunswick area. The school  attempts to keep class sizes particularly low in comparison to the rest of the state, although this has been hampered by severe funding cuts in the last fifteen years. It attempts to provide more opportunities than simply academic ones, giving strong attention to topics such as art, photography and music, which allows it to help some students who may otherwise drop out altogether.

Due to the small nature of the school site, the school has no recreational or sporting facilities of its own, and as such, the school has had to use those of the nearby Brunswick Secondary College campus (then one of two) - even after the campus closed in the early 1990s. Staff, parents and students of the school were heavily involved in the highly public campaign to save the former campus' gymnasium from demolition in 2003, even occupying the site for several weeks, as had been done with the successful Fitzroy High School campaign. They were ultimately successful, with a refurbished gymnasium opening in April 2005.

The site is listed in the Victorian Heritage Register.

References

External links

School website

Further reading
A history of the early years of the school ("Small School in a State of Change") has been written by its founder, Gil Freeman.

Educational institutions established in 1972
Public high schools in Victoria (Australia)
Heritage-listed buildings in Melbourne
1972 establishments in Australia
Buildings and structures in the City of Merri-bek